Laatsch is a German language surname. It stems from the German word latschen for "to slouch along" and was probably used as a nickname for a person with a slouching gait or a limp. Notable people with the name include:
 Brandon Laatsch, American filmmaker, YouTuber, and game developer 
 James F. Laatsch (1940), former member of the Wisconsin State Assembly

See also 
 Lasch

References 

German-language surnames
Surnames from nicknames